The Transvaal gold fields resulted from gold discoveries during the 19th century in the South African Republic. After insignificant discoveries from 1840 up to 1870, payable or substantial gold deposits were found at:

 Leydsdorp in 1870 and 1883
 Geelhoutboom farm, or Mac-Mac diggings, in 1873
 Pilgrim's Rest in 1873
 Barberton in 1881
 Kaapsehoop in 1882
 Ferreirasdorp in 1886 (in the Witwatersrand Basin, Witwatersrand)

See also
 Randlord
 Witwatersrand Gold Rush

Gold mines in South Africa
South African Republic